Bay County is located in the U.S. state of Michigan. As of the 2020 Census, the population was 103,856. The county seat is Bay City.

Bay County comprises the Bay City, MI Metropolitan Statistical Area and is included in the Saginaw-Midland-Bay City Combined Statistical Area in the Mid/Central Michigan region.

History

19th century

Bay County was created in 1857 from portions of Midland County, Saginaw County, and Arenac County.  Its name references that it "surrounds Saginaw Bay."  Being only sparsely populated at that time, Arenac County government was unorganized and was attached to Saginaw County for administrative purposes. There was considerable opposition to the creation of Bay County from elected officials in both Saginaw and Midland counties. In 1854, a bill introduced to the state legislature to create Bay County was defeated by a small majority.

In 1857, a new bill was introduced into the legislature. After initial opposition from the representatives of Saginaw and Midland counties, a compromise revision that would present the matter for ratification to the voters of "in said county" was passed by the legislature on February 17, 1857. The matter was put before all the voters of Saginaw and Midland counties and was soundly defeated. However, the population within the boundaries proposed for Bay County approved the measure. The bill passed by the legislature included phrasing, which was deliberately included by the Bay City lawyer Chester H. Freeman, that allowed Bay County to claim ratification. Under the act, the county was to become effective April 20, 1857.

Residents of Bay County held elections for county officials in June 1857. However, Saginaw County did not recognize the organization of the new county government. In the winter of 1858, Freeman secured passage of a bill in the legislature that would have confirmed the organization of Bay County. But the bill was vetoed by the governor. However, a case that went before the Michigan Supreme Court in its May 1858 term settled the matter. In the case, a defendant was tried in a Saginaw County court, but filed a plea for abatement, claiming that the supposed offense was committed in Bay County and was not in the jurisdiction of the Saginaw County court. Freeman had represented the defendant and prepared arguments, but became incapacitated due to illness. At the request of Freeman's wife, Colonel William M. Fenton argued the case before the Michigan Supreme Court, with the result that Bay County was declared a fully organized county.

20th century

During World War II, shipyards in Bay County, were used to produce US Destroyers and missile vessels.

In 1978, Bay County became the second Michigan county (after Oakland County) to adopt a County Executive form of government.  Act 139 of 1973 provides for an optional unified form of county government under an appointed County Manager or an elected County Executive.  With the County Executive, all departments of the county government that are not headed by a separate elected official (e.g. Treasurer, Clerk, Sheriff, etc.) are under the direction of the County Executive.  The County Executive also has veto power over the motions and resolutions passed by the County Commission.

Since the adoption of this form of government, Bay County has had four County Executives:  Gary Majeske (R) (1979–1989), Kim Higgs (D) (1989–1993), Thomas Hickner (D) (1993–2016), and James Barcia (D).

Geography
It is the fifth-smallest county in Michigan by land area.

The Saginaw River flows through Bay City while the Kawkawlin River drains much of the central portion of the county. The Pinconning River and Saganing Creek drain the northern portion. The Saginaw Bay of Lake Huron lies to the east, giving the county its name.

Major highways

 
 
 
  in Midland
 
 
 
 
 
 
 
 
 
 
 

Interstate 75 (I-75) and U.S. Highway 23 (US 23), which are concurrent within the county, are the major north–south route. North of Bay City, M-13 follows a parallel route a few miles to the east. US 10 has its eastern terminus in Bay City. M-25, M-15, and M-84 enter Bay City from the east, southeast and southwest respectively and terminate in or near the city. M-20 and Business US 10 end at US 10 as they enter the county.

Adjacent counties

 Arenac County  (north)
 Gladwin County  (northwest)
 Tuscola County  (southeast)
 Midland County  (west)
 Saginaw County  (south)

Demographics

The 2010 United States Census indicates Bay County had a 2010 population of 107,771. This is a decrease of -2,386 people from the 2000 United States Census. Overall, the county had a -2.2% growth rate during this ten-year period. In 2010 there were 44,603 households and 29,116 families in the county. The population density was 243.7 per square mile (94.1 square kilometers). There were 48,220 housing units at an average density of 109.0 per square mile (42.1 square kilometers). The racial and ethnic makeup of the county was 91.2% White, 1.5% Black or African American, 0.4% Native American, 0.5% Asian, 4.7% Hispanic or Latino, 0.1% from other races, and 1.6% from two or more races.

There were 44,603 households, out of which 28.5% had children under the age of 18 living with them, 48.6% were husband and wife families, 11.8% had a female householder with no husband present, 34.7% were non-families, and 29.3% were made up of individuals. The average household size was 2.38 and the average family size was 2.92.

In the county, the population was spread out, with 22.2% under age of 18, 8.5% from 18 to 24, 23.6% from 25 to 44, 29.5% from 45 to 64, and 16.2% who were 65 years of age or older. The median age was 42 years. For every 100 females there were 95.9 males. For every 100 females age 18 and over, there were 93 males.

The 2010 American Community Survey 1-year estimate indicates the median income for a household in the county was $45,451 and the median income for a family was $52,784. Males had a median income of $31,035 versus $18,294 for females. The per capita income for the county was $22,378. About 11.2% of families and 16.2% of the population were below the poverty line, including 23.7% of those under the age 18 and 7.0% of those age 65 or over.

Religion
The Roman Catholic Diocese of Saginaw is the controlling regional body for the Catholic Church.

Economy
According to Bay Future, Inc. the top employers in the county are:

Government
From 1932 to 2012, Bay County voted for the Democratic Party candidate in every Presidential election except for five national Republican landslides: 1952, 1956, 1972, 1980 and 1984. However, the county has turned increasingly Republican in recent elections.  The November 2022 election resulted in the first majority Republican Board of Commissioners ever sitting in Bay County since the adoption of the Optional Unified Form of County Government (Act 139). Despite this, Bay County had voted Democratic in all 3 statewide races in 2022, and Democrat James Barcia remains as County Executive.

Bay County government is set up under Public Act 139 of 1973. This format provides for an elected County Executive who, as chief administrator, has influence over all departments, except those headed by other elected officials. In that manner, the County Executive appoints and supervises all department heads. It is the duty of the County Executive to coordinate all county activities and unify the management of county affairs, enforce all orders, rules and ordinances passed by the Board of Commissioners and all laws enacted by the state. In addition, the County Executive must submit to the Board of Commissioners a recommended budget each year. The county government operates the jail, maintains rural roads, operates the major local courts,
keeps files of deeds and mortgages, maintains vital records, administers public health regulations, and
participates with the state in the provision of welfare and other social services. The county
Board of Commissioners controls the budget but has only limited authority to make laws or ordinances. Bay County has a Board of Road Commissioners, which consists of three commissioners who are elected and serve six-year staggered terms (one road commissioner elected every two years). The Board is the policy-making body of the Bay County Road Commission and is responsible for establishing budget priorities and managing the annual budget. In Michigan, most local government functions — police and fire, building and zoning, tax assessment, street
maintenance, etc. — are the responsibility of individual cities and townships.

Elected officials
 County Executive: James Barcia
 Prosecuting Attorney: Nancy E. Borushko
 Sheriff: Troy R. Cunningham
 County Clerk: Kathleen Zanotti
 County Treasurer: Weston Prince
 Register of Deeds: Brandon Krause
 Drain Commissioner: Michael Rivard
 Road Commissioners: William Schumacher, William Jordan, Kevin Shark

Board of Commissioners
7 members, elected from districts (three Democrats, four Republicans)

Communities

Cities
 Auburn
 Bay City (county seat)
 Essexville
 Pinconning
 Midland (partial)

Charter townships
 Bangor Charter Township
 Hampton Charter Township
 Monitor Charter Township
 Portsmouth Charter Township
 Williams Charter Township

Civil townships

 Beaver Township
 Frankenlust Township
 Fraser Township
 Garfield Township
 Gibson Township
 Kawkawlin Township
 Merritt Township
 Mount Forest Township
 Pinconning Township

Unincorporated communities

 Almeda Beach
 Amelith
 Aplin Beach
 Arn
 Beaver
 Bentley
 Brissette Beach
 Brooks
 Crump
 Donahue Beach
 Duel
 Fisherville
 Frankenlust
 Kawkawlin
 Killarney Beach
 Lagoon Beach
 Linwood
 Linwood Beach
 Little Killarney Beach
 Loehne
 Meyers Beach
 Mount Forest
 Munger
 Nine Mile
 North Williams
 Seidlers
 Three Churches Corner
 Tobico Beach
 Willard
 Woodville
 University Center

Former city
 West Bay City

See also
 Bay County Library System
 List of Michigan State Historic Sites in Bay County, Michigan
 National Register of Historic Places listings in Bay County, Michigan

References

External links
 Bay County Government
 
 Bay County Republican Party
 Bay County Democratic Party

 
Michigan counties
1857 establishments in Michigan
Populated places established in 1857